The Philosophy of Supplication is a famous Islamic/Iranian prayer, Written by Ali Shariati. It is written in poetic tense and regards the human life and a human's relation with God. The prayer ends with stating:

{| border="0"
|---
| "You teach me how to live;  I shall learn how to die."
|---
|}

Note that every verse of this poetic prayer begins with "My Lord."  For example, lines begin, "My Lord, give me the capability to tolerate an opposing point of view." and "My Lord, give me absolute submission through faith (iman), so that in the world, I may be in absolute rebellion."

See also
The War Prayer

External links
 What exactly is a Supplication
 full and revised version at Scribd

Islamic poetry
Islamic prayer
Works by Ali Shariati